Ramin Namiq oglu Guluzade  (born 1977 in Baku, Azerbaijan) is an Azerbaijani politician. He served as the Minister of Transport, Communications and High Technologies of the Republic of Azerbaijan from January 15, 2016 to January 26, 2021.

Biography
Ramin Namiq oglu Guluzade was born in Baku city, Azerbaijan on February 1, 1977. After finishing school No.167 in Yasamal district, Baku city, in 1993, entered Azerbaijan State Economic Institute. In 1997, graduated from the institute, and in 1999  received master's degree from the said institute. Worked at Heydar Aliyev Foundation in 2005-2015. Awarded Tereggi (Progress) Medal in 2014, by order of the President of the Republic of Azerbaijan for his active participation in preserving and popularizing the nationwide leader Heydar Aliyev's heritage. Appointed First Deputy Minister of Communications and High Technologies by order of the President of the Republic of Azerbaijan dated November 25, 2015. He was appointed Minister of Communications and High Technologies of the Republic of Azerbaijan by order of President of the Republic of Azerbaijan dated January 15, 2016. He was relieved from his post on January 25, 2021.

References

1977 births
Living people
Government ministers of Azerbaijan